The black-chinned babbler (Cyanoderma pyrrhops) is a babbler species in the family Timaliidae. It occurs in the foothills of the Himalayas from the Murree Hills in Pakistan to eastern Nepal. It inhabits subtropical and temperate forest at  altitudes. It is listed as Least Concern on the IUCN Red List.

It is biscuit-coloured, has a black chin and lores and a buffy grey crown.

Stachyris pyrrhops was the scientific name proposed by Edward Blyth in 1844 who described a greenish olivaceous babbler with a black chin and black lores from Nepal.
It was later placed in the genus Stachyridopsis.

References

External links 

black-chinned babbler
Birds of North India
Birds of Nepal
black-chinned babbler
black-chinned babbler
Taxonomy articles created by Polbot